The Federal Route 2 is a major east–west oriented federal highway in Malaysia. The  road connects Port Klang in Selangor to Kuantan Port in Pahang. The Federal Route 2 became the backbone of the road system linking the east and west coasts of Peninsula Malaysia before being surpassed by the East Coast Expressway E8.

Route background
The Federal Route 2 is divided into two sections – Kuala Lumpur–Klang Highway (Malay: Jalan Kuala Lumpur–Klang) and Kuala Lumpur–Kuantan Road (Malay: Jalan Kuala Lumpur–Kuantan), where both sections are connected at Kuala Lumpur. The Kuala Lumpur–Klang Highway consists of Jalan Syed Putra, Federal Highway Route 2, Persiaran Sultan Ibrahim, Jalan Jambatan Kota (also concurrents with the Federal Route 5) and Persiaran Raja Muda Musa, where almost all sections of the Kuala Lumpur–Klang Highway are built as a divided highway except the short section from Port Klang Interchange to Port Klang jetty. The Kilometre Zero of the Federal Route 2 is located at Port Klang, Selangor.

At the town centre of Klang, the FT2 highway intersects with Jalan Langat FT5 at Simpang Lima Roundabout Interchange. As a result, the FT5 concurrents with the FT2 along Jambatan Kota before the FT5 route is diverted to Jalan Kapar FT5 at Simpang Tujuh Roundabout Interchange.

The FT2 highway becomes a controlled-access expressway starting from Berkeley Roundabout Interchange to Seputeh Interchange, where the controlled-access section is popularly known as the Federal Highway Route 2. The section of the Federal Highway FT2 from Berkeley Roundabout Interchange to Subang Airport Interchange was a tolled section managed by PLUS Malaysia Berhad, the operator of the nation's longest expressway, the North–South Expressway. The Federal Highway FT2 later becomes a limited-access arterial highway again after Seputeh Interchange, where it becomes Jalan Syed Putra. Jalan Syed Putra FT2 was concluded at Bulatan Kinabalu where it joins with Jalan Kinabalu FT1.

Meanwhile, the Kuala Lumpur–Kuantan Road begins as Jalan Pahang FT2 from Pahang Roundabout at Jalan Tun Razak. The FT2 road is later diverted to Jalan Gombak FT2/FT68 at Setapak Interchange. At Kampung Bandar Dalam Intersection, the FT2 route is once again diverted to Jalan Kampung Bandar Dalam FT2, while Jalan Gombak changes its route number to FT68. At Kampung Bandar Dalam Interchange, the FT2 concurrents with Duta–Ulu Klang Expressway E33/FT2 to Taman Greenwood, Batu Caves, then it concurrents with the Kuala Lumpur Middle Ring Road 2 (KL MRR2) FT28 from Taman Greenwood to Gombak North Interchange, before once again concurrents with the Kuala Lumpur–Karak Expressway E8/FT2 for its entire length.

At the end of the Karak Expressway at Karak Interchange, the Federal Route 2 is diverted as an ordinary 2-lane federal road while the Karak Expressway proceeds as the East Coast Expressway. The Federal Route 2 overlaps again at Kuantan with the Federal Route 3. The eastern terminus of the Federal Route 2 is at the Kuantan Port, where it meets with the Federal Route 3.

Before the advent of the Swettenham Parkway (now Sultan Iskandar Highway) which is now a part of the Kuala Lumpur Middle Ring Road 1 (KL MRR1), the FT2 road overlapped with Jalan Kinabalu FT1 and Jalan Kuching FT1 from Kinabalu Roundabout Interchange to PWTC Interchange, where the FT2 was detoured to Jalan Tun Razak and Jalan Pahang. However, after the completion of the Kuala Lumpur–Petaling Jaya Traffic Dispersal Scheme in 1983 that extended the KL MRR1 to Jalan Istana Interchange that linked the MRR1 with Jalan Syed Putra FT2, the FT2 ceased to concurrent with the FT1 and was detoured to Lebuhraya Sultan Iskandar (formerly Lebuhraya Mahameru) instead.

History
The Federal Route 2 begins as part of the earliest trunk road to Kuantan, Pahang from Benta, where the road was constructed as an extension of the Kuala Kubu Road from Kuala Kubu Bharu, Selangor to Kuala Lipis, Pahang. The 80-mile Kuala Kubu Road, which now becomes the entire section of the Federal Routes 55 and parts of Federal Route 218 and 8, was constructed by the Public Works Department (JKR) in 1887. The Benta–Kuantan Road, which now forms the entire section of the Federal Route 64 (Benta–Maran) and a part of the Federal Route 2 from Maran to Kuantan, was constructed in 1915. The Kuala Lumpur–Bentong section was constructed at the same time, followed by the Bentong–Temerloh section in 1928.

The Kuala Lumpur–Kuantan Road FT2 was concluded in 1955 when the final section from Temerloh to Maran was opened to traffic on 11 June 1955. The final section took a very long time to be completed due to rainy season, huge floods and swampy region, as well as the advances of the Imperial Japanese Army during the Second World War and the activities of the Malayan Communist Party terrorists during the Malayan Emergency. Construction began from 1925 to and was completed in 1955.

In 1971, the old Temerloh Bridge spanning across the Pahang River was collapsed due to the huge flood in Temerloh. As a result, the Public Works Department (JKR) constructed a 575-m replacement bridge known as the Sultan Ahmad Shah Bridge FT2 beside the old bridge. The Sultan Ahmad Shah Bridge was much higher than the old bridge, forming the first grade-separated Interchange in Pahang that was linked to the Federal Route 10. The new bridge project also included a new roadway that bypassed Temerloh and Mentakab, causing the former Temerloh–Mentakab section to be re-gazetted as the Federal Route 87. The construction of the Sultan Ahmad Shah Bridge was completed in 1974.

Meanwhile, the Kuala Lumpur–Klang Highway FT2 was opened to traffic on 14 January 1959. The highway was intended as a replacement of the existing road system known as Jalan Klang Lama, Persiaran Selangor, Jalan Sungai Rasau and Jalan Batu Tiga Lama, allowing speeds of up to 60 mph. As a result, Jalan Klang Lama was downgraded into Selangor State Road B14. The Kuala Lumpur–Klang Highway FT2 was later being upgraded into a controlled-access highway by replacing the former at-grade intersection with grade-separated interchanges, making the highway as the nation's first controlled-access expressway. The upgraded controlled-access highway is now known as the Federal Highway Route 2.

In the 1970s, a replacement segment for the narrow and winding section from Kuala Lumpur to Karak (known as Jalan Gombak) was constructed. The replacement section was known as the Kuala Lumpur–Karak Highway FT2, featuring the 914.4-m Genting Sempah Tunnel. The 75.2-km toll highway was constructed at the cost of RM136.4 million and was opened to traffic on 7 January 1978. As a result, the old Jalan Gombak was re-gazetted as the Federal Route 68. In 1994, the Kuala Lumpur–Karak Highway FT2 was upgraded to a full controlled-access expressway by twinning the entire section, including the construction of the second tunnel beside the existing Genting Sempah Tunnel for eastbound traffic. The upgrade works began in 1994 by MTD Prime and was completed in 1998. However, only 60 km of the 75-km highway forms the present-day Kuala Lumpur–Karak Expressway E8/FT2; the remaining 15 km forms a part of the Kuala Lumpur Middle Ring Road 2 (KL MRR2) FT28 and Duta–Ulu Klang Expressway E33.

The construction of the extension of the Kuala Lumpur–Karak Expressway E8/FT2, known as the East Coast Expressway, was first announced in 1994 when the expressway itself was still under upgrading works. Initially, the East Coast Expressway was supposed to be constructed under a different route number by a consortium consisting MMC Corporation Berhad (through its subsidiary, Projek Lebuhraya Timur Sdn. Bhd. (Pelita)), MTD Group and Malaysian Resource Corporation Berhad (MRCB), but was ultimately constructed by MTD Group in 2001 after the former consortium withdrew from the job due to the effects of the 1997 Asian financial crisis. The East Coast Expressway was opened to motorists on 1 August 2004, taking the role of the Federal Route 2 as the main east–west route from Kuala Lumpur to Kuantan. The expressway retained the E8 route number similar to the upgraded Kuala Lumpur–Karak Expressway E8/FT2, which was also operated by MTD Group (now ANIH Berhad).

List of junctions and towns (west–east)

See also
 Malaysia Federal Route 1 – the main north–south backbone road of Peninsular Malaysia
 Malaysia Federal Route 4 – the second east–west backbone road of northern Peninsular Malaysia

References

002